The year 644 BC was a year of the pre-Julian Roman calendar. In the Roman Empire, it was known as year 110 Ab urbe condita. The denomination 644 BC for this year has been used since the early medieval period, when the Anno Domini calendar era became the prevalent method in Europe for naming years.

Events

Asia Minor 
 Cimmerian forces from Anatolia conquer Sardis and reach the peak of their power. King Gyges of Lydia has spent most of his 28-year reign fighting his southern and western neighbors in an effort to gain suzerainty over all of Western Asia Minor. He has helped the rebellion of Psamtik I, but he receives no support from his erstwhile Assyrian ally Ashurbanipal. Gyges falls in a battle against the Cimmerians under king Tugdamme (approximate date). 
 Ardys succeeds his father Gyges as the second Mermnad king of Lydia. During his reign he finds payment of tribute to Assyria preferable to rule by the Cimmerians, who will be routed a few decades later.

Births

Deaths
 Gyges, king of Lydia (approximate date)
 Bao Shuya, prominent official under Duke Huan of Qi

References